Asouda  is a village near Hapur in the Hapur district of Uttar Pradesh state of India.

References

Villages in Hapur district